Puriya is a major hexatonic raga of Hindustani classical music.

Note emphasis: Ni, Ga, (Ma is an important pivot note.)

Pakad or Chalan
Ni Ni Ni Ma, Ni Dha Ni

re Sa

Ma, (Ni) D (Sa) Ni (re) Sa    = grace note

Ni re Ga

Ni re Ga, Ga re Sa

Ni re Ma Ma Ga

Ma Dha Ni, Ma Dha, Ga Ma G

Details

Sources 

Hindustani ragas